The Aqua Augusta, or Serino Aqueduct, was one of the largest, most complex and costliest aqueduct systems in the Roman world; it supplied water to at least eight ancient cities in the Bay of Naples including Pompeii and Herculaneum. This aqueduct was unlike any other of its time, being a regional network rather than being focussed on one urban centre.

Route of the aqueduct

The eastern parts of the route of the aqueduct are well known thanks to the writings of two Italian engineers, who were asked to see if it could be brought back in use as the main water supply of Naples in the 16th and 19th centuries. The western part beyond Naples was less known until recent research.

There were ten branches, seven of which were for cities while three were for some of the numerous luxurious villas in this area popular with rich Romans, such as the Villa Pollio at Posillipo. The Aqua Augusta was one of the most difficult and costly aqueducts ever constructed by an ancient civilisation due to its length and the difficult terrain it crossed. Despite its size and complexity, the Aqua Augusta is today largely unknown as a major monument because most of it is underground.

The aqueduct's main source, the Fons Augusteus (now known as Acquaro-Pelosi), was in the Terminio-Tuoro mountains near the modern town of Serino not far from the city of Avellino and at 376 m above sea level. It is likely that there were several supplementary sources at other points in the network, including the branches from Avellino and at Scalandrone near Baiae. One of its main terminations was the enormous Piscina Mirabilis cistern at the naval base and port of Misenum.

Since the aqueduct traversed such a distance, many difficulties were encountered when building it: several long tunnels were cut through mountains; the  Monti di Forino tunnel crossed a watershed in the Apennines (one of the longest Roman tunnels), and a  tunnel crossed into the Sarno plain; also at the Crypta Neapolitana road tunnel and the Grotta di Cocceio road tunnel. A  raised section on arches was built at Pomigliano d’Arco. There was ground movement due to seismic activity and a sea crossing was needed to the island of Nisida.

The aqueduct passed underground 400m south of the Roman baths at Agnano with its own branch, and a few metres north of the amphitheatre of Pozzuoli with a 70m branch to the aqueduct.

There is evidence that a large number of private users were members of the Rome senatorial class. In Rome, a letter from the emperor was required to gain a private connection and so it seems that imperial favour was also a factor in accessing the Augusta's water.

History

The Emperor Augustus (or more likely his close friend and ally Agrippa) had the Aqua Augusta built between 30 and 20 BC.<ref name="Hodge, A.T">Hodge, A.T., Roman Aqueducts & Water Supply, 2nd ed. London: Duckworth.</ref>

During the war with Pompeius, Augustus ordered the construction of the Portus Julius harbour complex just west of Puteoli. Later, this harbour was seen as less ideal for the navy because of silting problems and a new major naval base was built further west at Misenum, where two lakes were connected to become the basis of the western Mediterranean war fleet. Large quantities of fresh water were needed for the base itself and for the ships, which must have been one of the reasons why Augustus had the new aqueduct built. The main cistern filled by the aqueduct is the Piscina Mirabilis in Misenum. 

Such a major monument required constant maintenance; there were major repairs in the Flavian period (1st century AD) with the addition of parallel tunnels and the Emperor Constantine also engaged in a massive restoration documented on an inscription tablet discovered in Serino and dated to AD 324. The destinations listed are: Nola, Acerrae, Atella, Naples, Pozzuoli, Baiae, Cumae, and Misenum.

The cities of Pompeii, Herculaneum and Stabiae were also originally supplied by the aqueduct but being destroyed and covered by the eruption of Mount Vesuvius in 79 AD they did not appear on this list. This cut off the supply of water to all the towns except Nola and Acerrae. The poor administrative and economic situation in Campania at this time, and Italy in general, prevented major repairs to the Augusta. Written references to aqueducts in Naples after this time only refer to other aqueducts that were now in the area.

In modern times, parts of the aqueduct, in addition to the Piscina Mirabilis were vital to the region's survival during World War II. Many locals used the areas as air-raid shelters.

Visible remains
There are few visible remains of the aqueduct today, although much of it still exists below ground. Traces of the original structure may be found at a number of sites in and around Naples.

These include:

 supporting wall for arches of a raised aqueduct section at Muro d'Arce near via Muro d'Arce, Sarno
 "Ponte Tirone": two parallel sections in Palma Campania (Tirone District), 
 the two parallel Ponti Rossi aqueduct bridges
 a section next to the Crypta Neapolitana in the Parco Vergiliano at Piedigrotta where it occupied a parallel tunnel
 a branch to the Pozzuoli amphitheatre and the main aqueduct to the north
 a water catchment cave near Scalandrone
 a section next to the entrance to the Baia archaeological park
 the well-preserved Piscina Mirabilis at Misenum. This is one of the largest such reservoirs on an aqueduct known in the Roman Empire and survives almost intact to this day. It was probably intended for a large villa, or possibly as a strategic water resource for the naval base though it lies about  distant.

In basements between via Arena and vico Traetta

Recently, arches of the twin aqueduct have been revealed in cellars of buildings in Rione Sanità, in 6 via Arena alla Sanità, and are open to the public. They run from north to south for a long section at a separation of 10m and then come as close as 2m in the southern part. The western channel is Augustan, whereas the eastern part was added later.

They sparked increased interest in research, which has led to more exploration of the line of the monumental aqueduct. An immense cistern on the line of the channels has been found next to the Hellenistic necropolis. Also a new piece of the ancient aqueduct has been identified uphill from via Foria in the “Miracoli” district where the channel runs underground for 220 m.

 Literary depictions 
It features prominently in the novel Pompeii by Robert Harris, whose protagonist is a water engineer ("Aquarius") sent from Rome to maintain the aqueduct in AD 79 during the time around the eruption of Mount Vesuvius.

 See also 
Roman aqueducts
Roman engineering
Roman technology
List of Roman cisterns

 References 

Hodge, A.T. (2001). Roman Aqueducts & Water Supply'', 2nd ed. London: Duckworth.

External links 

romanaqueducts.info

Roman aqueducts in Italy
Archaeological sites in Naples
Aqueducts in Italy
Pompeii (ancient city)
Archaeological sites in Campania